Edi Hafid is an Indonesian footballer who currently plays for Pelita Bandung Raya as a defender.

References

External links
 Profile at Goal.com
 Profile at Soccerway

Indonesian footballers
Living people
1983 births
Pelita Bandung Raya players
Persib Bandung players
Liga 1 (Indonesia) players
Borneo F.C. players
Association football defenders
Sportspeople from Bandung